Marcelo Enrique Guzmán (born 16 January 1985) is an Argentine professional footballer who plays as a midfielder.

Career
Guzmán started his career with Racing de Córdoba. His professional debut was one of thirty-one appearances during the 2004–05 Primera B Nacional season, which ended with relegation to Torneo Argentino A. Twenty-five more appearances followed for Racing in 2005–06, before Guzmán was signed by Quilmes of the Argentine Primera División. However, he failed to feature in the 2006–07 season as Quilmes were relegated to Primera B Nacional. In June 2009, Guzmán scored his first Quilmes goal in a 0–2 win versus Aldosivi. June 2010 saw Guzmán completed a move to fellow Primera B Nacional team Patronato.

He remained with Patronato for two seasons, scoring once in sixty-seven matches, prior to having a spell with Gimnasia y Esgrima for the 2012–13 campaign. He made twenty-nine appearances for Gimnasia y Esgrima, receiving two red cards in the process as the club finished tenth. On 30 June 2013, Guzmán rejoined Patronato of Primera B Nacional. He made seventy-one appearances and scored two goals in his first three seasons back with Patronato, before making his Primera División debut for the club in February 2016 following promotion in December 2015. On 17 June 2018, Guzmán joined Instituto of the second tier.

Guzmán signed with Atlético de Rafaela in January 2019. His opening appearance came in a home loss to Villa Dálmine on 1 February.

Career statistics
.

References

External links

1985 births
Living people
Footballers from Córdoba, Argentina
Argentine footballers
Association football midfielders
Primera Nacional players
Torneo Argentino A players
Argentine Primera División players
Racing de Córdoba footballers
Quilmes Atlético Club footballers
Club Atlético Patronato footballers
Gimnasia y Esgrima de Jujuy footballers
Instituto footballers
Atlético de Rafaela footballers
Club y Biblioteca Ramón Santamarina footballers